Amma Pillai is a 1990 Indian Tamil-language film, directed by R. C. Shakthi and produced by M. K. Raju. It stars Ramki and Seetha. It is a remake of the Malayalam film Mortuary.

This film was dubbed in Telugu by Late Shri M.Nageswara Rao, Film Producer and Director with name - " Ee Theerpu Ele Cheppali" Produced by M.Subramanyam and Balaji. But this film was unreleased due to sudden demie of M.Nageswara Roa in road accident in Chennai ( then Madras) on 4.4.94.

Cast 

Ramki
Seetha
Jaishankar
Srividya
Nassar
Charle
S. S. Chandran
Kovai Sarala

Soundtrack
The music was composed by Shankar–Ganesh.

References

External links
 

1990 films
1990s Tamil-language films
Films scored by Shankar–Ganesh
Indian courtroom films
Films set in universities and colleges
Medical-themed films
Fictional portrayals of the Tamil Nadu Police
Procedural films
Films directed by R. C. Sakthi
Tamil remakes of Malayalam films